Trübner is a surname. Notable people with the surname include:

Matthias Trübner, East German bobsledder who competed in the mid-1980s
Michael Trübner, East German bobsledder who competed in the early 1980s
Nicholas Trübner  (1817–1884), German-English publisher and linguist
Wilhelm Trübner (1851–1917), German realist painter of the circle of Wilhelm Leibl

See also
Trübner & Co, a publisher now part of Routledge